Norton Conyers House is a grade II* listed late medieval manor house with Stuart and Georgian additions sited in North Yorkshire, England,  some 4 miles (7 km) north of Ripon.

The frontage has distinctive Dutch-style gables and is thought to be the inspiration for Charlotte Brontë's novel Jane Eyre. It has an 18th-century garden surrounding an Orangery. The house is currently undergoing restoration but is open for occasional guided tours.

It is built in two storeys with a four-bay frontage to a square floor plan of brick with a Westmorland slate roof. The nearby stable block is also grade II* listed.

History

The manor of Norton Conyers once belonged to Richard Norton who, with his sons, was executed for rebellion in 1569. After briefly belonging to the Musgraves it was acquired by Sir Richard Graham (–1654) in 1624 and, except for 20 years between 1862 and 1882, has remained in the Graham family ever since.

Sir Richard Graham was a Royalist from Cumberland who was wounded in 1644 at the Battle of Marston Moor. The Graham Baronetcy, of Norton Conyers in the County of York, was created in the Baronetage of England on 17 November 1662 for Richard Graham (1636–1711), the second son of Sir Richard Graham (–1654), in honour of his services to the Restoration of the Monarchy.

References

External links

 Official website

Country houses in North Yorkshire
Grade II* listed buildings in North Yorkshire